Javier Lachica Patiño (born February 14, 1988) is a former professional footballer who played as a striker. He represented the Philippines national team from 2013 to 2019.

Born in Spain to a Spanish father and Filipino mother, Patiño began his career in the Divisiones Regionales and moved up to the Tercera División and Segunda División. He then played in the Chinese Super League and Thai League 1, notably with Buriram United where he won several accolades.

Early life
Patiño was born in San Sebastián de los Reyes, Community of Madrid, to a Spanish father and a Filipino mother from Dumanjug, Cebu.

Club career

Córdoba
Patiño played his first four seasons as a senior in amateur football, representing local clubs Alcobendas CF and UD San Sebastián de los Reyes. In summer 2011 he moved straight to the second division, signing a three-year contract with Córdoba CF.

In his first year with the Andalusians, Patiño scored eight goals in 35 games, notably netting the games' only goal against SD Huesca (away), UD Las Palmas (home) and Recreativo de Huelva (away). On the last day of the January 2013 transfer window, he was loaned to fellow league side Xerez CD until the end of the season.

Buriram
Patiño terminated his contract with Córdoba on 9 March 2013, joining Buriram United F.C. of the Thai Premier League shortly after. He marked his debut for his new team with a brace of goals in their 6–1 thrashing of Songkhla United FC.

Henan Jianye
On 21 January 2015, Patiño transferred to Chinese Super League club Henan Jianye FC. He scored twice on his debut on 8 March, helping his team to a 3–1 home win against Tianjin Teda FC.

On 20 February 2018, as he was nursing a knee injury, Patiño was released and Henan refused to pay him his due wages.

Return to Buriram
In April 2018, Patiño returned to Buriram United.

Retirement
Patiño retired competitive football in November 2021, last playing for Thai League 1 side Port F.C.

International career

The Philippine Football Federation were reportedly notified of Patiño through Juan Luis Guirado, who was also born in Spain and an international footballer for the Philippines. In late 2012, he was reported to be applying for Filipino citizenship to open the possibility of playing international football for that country. He successfully obtained his Filipino passport just in time for the 2014 AFC Challenge Cup qualification tournament which took place from 24 to 26 March 2013 in Manila, and made it into the final 23-man squad, also receiving compliments from national team head coach Michael Weiß, who stated, "Patiño is definitely a top player but it is a team sport and it takes time to connect with the other player. We should give him time, we know that we can expect something but perhaps not the best yet".

Patiño made his debut on 24 March 2013 in the opening game of the Challenge Cup qualifying campaign, scoring twice in an 8–0 win against Cambodia. Two days later, against Turkmenistan, he again played the full 90 minutes, helping his team win 1–0 as they qualified for the finals.

Patiño would not appear for the Philippines until March the following year, where they lost 0–1 to Azerbaijan in a friendly match. It was part of the national team's preparations for the AFC Challenge Cup which he was not able to take part in due to not being released by his club, as the tournament was not part of FIFA's international match calendar; later that year, he would also miss out on 2014 AFF Championship as he had to undergo back surgery.

Career statistics

Club

International goals
 (Philippines score listed first, score column indicates score after each Patiño goal)

Honours
Buriram United 
Thai League 1: 2013, 2014, 2018
Thai FA Cup: 2013
Thai League Cup: 2013
Thailand Champions Cup: 2019
Kor Royal Cup: 2014

References

External links
 
 Stats at Futbolesta 

1988 births
Living people
People from San Sebastián de los Reyes
Spanish people of Filipino descent
Spanish sportspeople of Asian descent
Citizens of the Philippines through descent
Filipino people of Spanish descent
Sportspeople of Spanish descent
Spanish footballers
Filipino footballers
Footballers from the Community of Madrid
Association football forwards
Segunda División players
Tercera División players
UD San Sebastián de los Reyes players
Córdoba CF players
Xerez CD footballers
Javier Patino
Javier Patino
Javier Patino
Javier Patino
Chinese Super League players
Henan Songshan Longmen F.C. players
Philippines international footballers
2019 AFC Asian Cup players
Spanish expatriate footballers
Filipino expatriate footballers
Expatriate footballers in Thailand
Expatriate footballers in China
Filipino expatriate sportspeople in Thailand